Mark Ludbrook (born 19 January 1967 in Port Colborne) is a Canadian Paralympic athlete. In the 1984 Paralympics, he won a bronze medal in swimming the Men's 100 m Freestyle A4. In the 1998 Winter Paralympics, he won another bronze medal in alpine skiing in Men's Super-G LW4. He is one of few Canadians to win medals in the Summer and Winter Paralympics.

References

Swimmers at the 1984 Summer Paralympics
Swimmers at the 1988 Summer Paralympics
Swimmers at the 1992 Summer Paralympics
Alpine skiers at the 1998 Winter Paralympics
Alpine skiers at the 2002 Winter Paralympics
Paralympic bronze medalists for Canada
1967 births
Living people
Medalists at the 1984 Summer Paralympics
Medalists at the 1998 Winter Paralympics
Paralympic medalists in alpine skiing
Paralympic alpine skiers of Canada
Paralympic medalists in swimming
Canadian male freestyle swimmers